The 2003–04 Football League Trophy, known as the LDV Vans Trophy for sponsorship reasons, was the 21st season in the history of the competition. A straight knockout competition for English football clubs in the third and fourth tiers of the English football league system.

In all, 60 clubs entered the competition, including twelve from the Conference National. It was split into two sections, Northern and Southern, with the winners of each section contesting the final at the Millennium Stadium, Cardiff. The competition began on 13 October 2003 and concluded on 21 March 2004.

The winners were Blackpool, who defeated Southend United 2–0 to win the title for a second time.

First round
Four clubs received a bye into the Second Round. Bury and Huddersfield Town in the Northern section, and Northampton Town and Swansea City in the Southern section.

Northern section

Southern section

Second round

Northern section

Southern section

Quarter finals

Northern section

Southern section

Semi finals

Northern section

Southern section

Area Finals

Northern section

Southern Section

Final

References

External links
Official website

EFL Trophy
Tro
Tro